Silver Dollar is a 1932 American pre-Code biographical film starring Edward G. Robinson, Bebe Daniels and Aline MacMahon. Based on David Karsner's biography of the same name, it tells the story of the rise and fall of Horace Tabor (renamed Yates Martin), a silver tycoon in 19th century Colorado.

A copy is preserved in the Library of Congress.

Plot
Kansas farmer Yates Martin uproots his uncomplaining wife Sarah  and baby son to 1876 Colorado in search of gold. He buys a claim, then immediately abandons it when two prospectors tell him of a strike in Leadville. Taking Sarah's prudent advice, he sets up a store there. To her dismay, however, he stakes miners in return for partnerships in their diggings. Just as the Martins run out of money and decide to return to Kansas, prospectors Rische and Hook show up with the news that they have struck it rich, not with gold but with silver, and Yates has a third share of it.

Yates spends his new-found riches with great abandon, purchasing, among other things, a claim from a seemingly downtrodden miner for $50,000, over his suspicious wife's objections. He is asked to run for Lieutenant Governor of Colorado. When his foreman informs him that the claim he bought is worthless, Yates tells him to keep on digging, at least until the election is over, so that he will not look like a fool. As it turns out, not only does he win the election, the claim yields a lode even richer than his first.

Yates decides to build Denver an opulent opera house. As he is inspecting its construction, he meets the alluring Lily Owens, who becomes his mistress. At the grand opening of the opera house, Yates' guest of honor is none other than General Ulysses S. Grant.

Yates sets his sights higher, using his money to take the vacated seat of a U.S. senator. He divorces a heartbroken Sarah and marries Lily in Washington, DC, with the President as a wedding guest.

However, when the president decides to put the country on the gold standard, the price of silver plummets, and Yates loses everything except the Matchless mine, which is not worth working at the current price. He declines Sarah's offer of money. A friend obtains the post of postmaster of Denver for him, but Yates collapses and dies penniless.

Cast
 Edward G. Robinson as Yates Martin
 Bebe Daniels as Lily Owens Martin
 Aline MacMahon as Sarah Martin
 DeWitt Jennings as George, the Mine Foreman
 Robert Warwick as Colonel Stanton
 Russell Simpson as Hamlin
 Harry Holman as Adams
 Charles Middleton as Jenkins
 Emmett Corrigan as President Chester A. Arthur
 Christian Rub as Rische
 Lee Kohlmar as Hook
 Wade Boteler as Mike, a Miner
 Leon Ames as Secretary (uncredited)
 Charles Coleman as Butler (uncredited)
 Walter Long as Miner (uncredited)
 Walter Rodgers as General Ulysses S. Grant (uncredited)

References

External links
 
 
 
 

American black-and-white films
Films based on biographies
Films directed by Alfred E. Green
First National Pictures films
Films set in Colorado
Films about mining
Cultural depictions of Ulysses S. Grant
Cultural depictions of Chester A. Arthur
Films set in the 19th century
American historical drama films
1930s historical drama films
1932 drama films
1932 films
1930s English-language films
1930s American films